The Death Penalty: Opposing Viewpoints is a book in the Opposing Viewpoints series. It presents selections of contrasting viewpoints on the death penalty: first surveying centuries of debate on it; then questioning whether it is just; whether it is an effective deterrent; and whether it is applied fairly. It was edited by Mary E. Williams.

Now in its sixth edition, it was published by Greenhaven Press of San Diego in 2006. Earlier editions were published in 1986, 1991, 1997, 1998, and 2002.

Contents of the 2002 edition

External links
The Death Penalty at BookRags.com.

Death Penalty: Opposing Viewpoints (2002)
Death Penalty: Opposing Viewpoints (2002)
Books in the Opposing Viewpoints series
Greenhaven Press books